Sungai Way is a suburb of Petaling Jaya, Petaling District, Selangor, Malaysia. It was established in 1949 during Briggs Plan, as a Chinese new village. After independence, Sungai Way become a populated place and its surroundings.had established new industrial zone (known as Sungai Way industrial zone) prior to the opening of Federal Highway, and also Subang-Sungai Way (Subang Jaya sections) and Bandar Sunway. Sungai Way has an official name as "Seri Setia". Naming of Sungai Way was adopted from nearby river as "sungai" and "way" in.English.

References

 

Petaling Jaya
Populated places in Selangor